Papilio charopus, the tailed green-banded swallowtail, is a species of swallowtail butterfly from the genus Papilio that is found in Nigeria, Cameroon, Equatorial Guinea, Republic of the Congo, Uganda, Rwanda, and Burundi.

Subspecies
Papilio charopus charopus (Nigeria, Cameroon, Equatorial Guinea: Bioko)
Papilio charopus juventus Le Cerf, 1924 (TL: Congo Republic [Semliki Valley]; Congo Republic (Ituri, Kivu), western Uganda, Rwanda, Burundi) [syn. = P. c. montuosus (Joicey & Talbot, 1927; Encycl. Ent. (B3) 2 (1): 2; (TL: Congo Republic [N.W. Kivu, Upper Iowa Valley, near msisisi, 5000-6000ft]), junior synonym]

Habitat
Highland forests (Congolian forests, Lower Guinean forests).

Status
Fairly common and not threatened.

Description
The ground colour is black. The markings are metallic blue. The blue band reaches the hind wing margin in area lb.Seitz- Apex of the forewing produced and the distal margin therefore distinctly 
excised at the end of veins 5 and 6; forewing beneath with four large yellowish submarginal spots in cellules 1 b—4; the blue median band of the upper surface gradually and very considerably widened posteriorly, so that the spots of cellules 2 and 8 of the hindwing are very long and cover much more than half their cellules; the submarginal spots of the hindwing beneath of the ground-colour and consequently only indicated by their silver rings. — Ashanti to the Cameroons.

Taxonomy
Papilio charopus belongs to a clade called the nireus species group with 15 members. The pattern is black with green or blue bands and spots and the butterflies, although called swallowtails lack tails with the exception of this species Papilio charopus and Papilio hornimani. The clade members are:

Papilio aristophontes Oberthür, 1897
Papilio nireus Linnaeus, 1758 
Papilio charopus Westwood, 1843
Papilio chitondensis de Sousa & Fernandes, 1966 
Papilio chrapkowskii Suffert, 1904 
Papilio chrapkowskoides Storace, 1952 
Papilio desmondi van Someren, 1939 
Papilio hornimani Distant, 1879 
Papilio interjectana Vane-Wright, 1995
Papilio manlius Fabricius, 1798
Papilio microps Storace, 1951 
Papilio sosia Rothschild & Jordan, 1903
Papilio thuraui Karsch, 1900
Papilio ufipa Carcasson, 1961
Papilio wilsoni Rothschild, 1926

References

Carcasson, R.H. (1960). "The Swallowtail Butterflies of East Africa (Lepidoptera, Papilionidae)". Journal of the East Africa Natural History Society pdf Key to East Africa members of the species group, diagnostic and other notes and figures. (Permission to host granted by The East Africa Natural History Society

charopus
Butterflies described in 1843